The Williamson County Courthouse is a courthouse in Georgetown, Texas, United States. It was designed by Charles Henry Page in 1909, and exhibits Beaux-Arts architecture. During the 2000s, the building underwent a $9 million restoration. The courthouse was rededicated in October 2006.

The building is part of the Williamson County Courthouse Historic District. A Confederate monument is installed outside the courthouse.

See also
List of county courthouses in Texas
List of Recorded Texas Historic Landmarks (Trinity-Zavala)
National Register of Historic Places listings in Williamson County, Texas

References

External links
 

1911 establishments in Texas
Beaux-Arts architecture in Texas
Buildings and structures in Georgetown, Texas
County courthouses in Texas
Government buildings completed in 1911